Andoni Imaz Garmendia (born 5 September 1971) is a Spanish retired footballer who played as a midfielder.

He appeared in 225 La Liga matches over ten seasons, scoring a total of eight goals for Real Sociedad and Athletic Bilbao.

Club career

Real Sociedad
Born in San Sebastián, Gipuzkoa, Imaz was immediately thrust into hometown club Real Sociedad's starting XI in La Liga at the age of 20 after a single season in the reserves. His debut in the competition took place on 8 September 1991, when he played the entire 0–0 home draw against Real Zaragoza. He scored his first top-division goal on 10 November 1991, helping his team to a 2–2 away draw with Real Valladolid.

In 1993, Imaz acted as captain in the inaugural match at the Anoeta Stadium, a 2–2 friendly draw with Real Madrid. During his spell, he never appeared in less than 26 league games.

Athletic Bilbao
In the summer of 1998, Imaz opted against renewing his contract and signed with Basque Country neighbours Athletic Bilbao. After helping the Lions to reach the group phase of the 1998–99 UEFA Champions League by netting in the 2–1 away loss against FC Dinamo Tbilisi (eventually qualifying via the away goals rule) he played five times in that stage of the tournament, which ended in elimination in last place.

After 26 league matches over his first two seasons, Imaz was rarely selected after the arrival of manager Txetxu Rojo, meeting the same fate under Jupp Heynckes and retiring at only 30 due to injury problems.

International career
Imaz won one cap for Spain, featuring the full 90 minutes in a 1–1 friendly with Mexico in Las Palmas. He also featured for the unofficial Basque Country regional team.

Post-retirement
After retiring, Imaz engaged in politics, running as sports councillor for the Basque Nationalist Party in the town  of Tolosa and being elected in 2003. He resigned after one four-year term, claiming he had "had enough".

In 2013, Imaz was appointed as Athletic Bilbao's match delegate, being voted the league's best the following year. He left the position in 2019, to pursue other interests.

Honours
Spain U21
UEFA European Under-21 Championship third place: 1994

References

External links

1971 births
Living people
Spanish footballers
Footballers from San Sebastián
Association football midfielders
La Liga players
Segunda División B players
Real Sociedad B footballers
Real Sociedad footballers
Athletic Bilbao footballers
Spain under-21 international footballers
Spain under-23 international footballers
Spain international footballers
Basque Country international footballers
Athletic Bilbao non-playing staff
Spanish politicians
Basque Nationalist Party politicians